On August 12, 1853, two Providence and Worcester Railroad passenger trains collided head-on in Valley Falls, Rhode Island. The accident resulted in 14 fatalities and a further 17 injuries. The cause of the accident was the engineer of the northbound train misjudging the railroad timetable. At the time, trains operated based on a fixed timetable, without any railroad signaling system in place. The collision was one of the first to be photographed.

Background
The Providence and Worcester Railroad line was on a single track. Engineers would base their travels off of time tables that were provided, as well as keep track of time on their own watches. By using this method, strict time schedules ensured the line was clear for individual trains to pass by. One train would wait in the siding for the allotted time to pass, after which, it was assumed that the tracks were clear.

Incident
The train bound for Providence had reached its double-track siding and waited the necessary five minute span. After which, the engineer proceeded to go back onto the single track. The Worcester-bound train had not reached the siding yet. At a blind curve, the two trains collided, resulting in a boiler explosion and telescoping of the first cars on the Providence-bound excursion.

Aftermath
Fourteen people were killed and seventeen severely injured in the collision. It was revealed the Worcester-bound engineer was behind schedule and had attempted to make up time by traveling at full speed. The accident was immediately photographed and would later be published on August 27, 1853 in The Illustrated News of New York, a short lived newspaper owned by P. T. Barnum''.

References

Railway accidents in 1853
Rail accidents caused by a driver's error
1853 in Rhode Island
Transportation disasters in Rhode Island
Providence and Worcester Railroad